Epicephala euchalina is a moth of the family Gracillariidae. It is known from Myanmar.

References

Epicephala
Moths described in 1922